Rathinda is a butterfly genus in the family Lycaenidae. It consists of a single species, Rathinda amor, the monkey puzzle, found in Sri Lanka and India.

Description

Habitat
The species is endemic to South Asia, specifically India's Western Ghats, the southern Indian plains, Bangladesh, and Sri Lanka. It thrives in jungles of moderate to heavy rainfall and scrub forests below . It prefers the undergrowth but can be seen along forest paths and clearings. It can also be seen in gardens with one or more of its host plants.

Life cycle

Larva
The caterpillars are pale green and possess fleshy, red protrusions along the back.

Pupa
The chrysalis is green and turns brown as it nears maturity. The pupa is attached to foliage by a single stalk at the tail end.

Imago 
The monkey puzzle is a weak flier. It keeps low to the ground and generally does not stay airborne for long. When it lands, it tends to turn around, sidestep, and waggle its tail filaments. This may serve to confuse predators as to which end is the butterfly's head.

Food plants
The butterfly feeds on soapberries, myrtles, and mangos as well as plants from the families Rubiaceae (Notably Ixora coccinea), Dipterocarpeae, Euphorbiaceae, and Loranthaceae,.

See also
List of butterflies of India (Lycaenidae)

References

 
 
 
 
 
 
 Shihan, T.R. (2016) A Photographic Guide to the Butterflies of Bangladesh. Butterfly Reintroduction Farm, Chuadanga, Bangladesh.

Butterflies of Asia
Monotypic butterfly genera
Horagini
Taxa named by Frederic Moore
Lycaenidae genera